John "Red" Brown (1786–1852) was a politician in the Republic of Texas and early statehood Texas who served briefly as Speaker of the Texas House of Representatives during the First Texas Legislature. Brown was also one of the founders of the Democratic Party in Texas.

Brown was probably born in Ireland on 30 August 1786. He moved to Texas in 1836 to near Nacogdoches. Early Texas census records list him as an Irishman and a farmer. Brown represented Nacogdoches County in the Sixth Congress of the Republic of Texas from 1841 to 1842.

Brown was elected to the First Texas Legislature after annexation of Texas into the United States. On 3 March 1846, Speaker William Crump was given a leave of absence, Brown was elected Speaker of the House pro tempore. On 9 March 1846, Brown resigned as Speaker pro tempore, and the House elected Edward Thomas Branch.

He was a founder of Henderson County when it was formed from Nacogdoches County in 1846. Brown served as a notary public and a ferry operator, and received a license to operate a toll-bridge over Kickapoo Creek near Old Normandy (present-day Brownsboro, which was named for John Brown). On 27 April 1846, Brown helped to found the Texas Democratic Party in Austin. Brown served as a commissioner to help locate the state penitentiary in 1848. In 1850, Brown was one of the commissioners that selected Athens as the seat of Henderson County.

Brown was married to Margaret Hodges Brooks. After her death in 1849, he married Elizabeth Holland in 1851. He probably died in 1852.

Notes

References

 

1786 births
1852 deaths
Speakers of the Texas House of Representatives
Democratic Party members of the Texas House of Representatives
Irish emigrants to the United States (before 1923)
Irish-American history and culture in Texas
19th-century American politicians